William Chen may refer to:

 Bill Chen (born 1970), American quantitative analyst, poker player and software designer
 William C. C. Chen (born 1935), Grandmaster of Yang-style t'ai chi ch'uan